Oregon is a U.S. state in the Pacific Northwest

Oregon may also refer to:

Places
United States
 Oregon, Arkansas
 Oregon, Illinois
 Oregon, Kentucky
 Oregon, Maryland
 Oregon, Missouri
 Oregon, Ohio
 Oregon, Pennsylvania
 Oregon, Tennessee
 Oregon (town), Wisconsin
 Oregon, Wisconsin (the village it contains)
 Oregon City, California
 Oregon City, Oregon
 Oregon County, Missouri
 Oregon District, a neighborhood in Dayton, Ohio
 Oregon Hill, a neighborhood in Richmond, Virginia
 Oregon Inlet, an inlet in the state of North Carolina
 Oregon Township, Michigan
 Oregon Township, Pennsylvania

Historical usage
 Oregon (toponym), etymology of the name "Oregon"
 Oregon Country
 Oregon Mission
 Oregon Territory
 Oregon Trail

Botany
Douglas-fir, a timber commonly known as "oregon" or "oregon pine"
 The Oregon-grape, a plant in the genus Mahonia

Music
 Oregon (band), an American jazz and world music group
 Oregon (album)
 Oregon, a piece of music for concert band, by James Swearingen
 Oregon, a composition by composer Jacob de Haan
 Oregon, a song written by John Linnell

Ships
Oregon (sidewheeler 1852), a steamboat in Oregon, United States, in the 1850s
CSS Oregon, a Confederate gunboat
NOAAS Oregon (R 551), a fisheries research vessel in service with the U.S. Fish and Wildlife Service from 1949 to 1970 and with the U.S. National Oceanic and Atmospheric Administration from 1970 to 1980
NOAAS Oregon II (R 332), a fisheries research vessel in service with the U.S. Fish and Wildlife Service from 1967 to 1970 and with the U.S. National Oceanic and Atmospheric Administration since 1970
SS Oregon, the name of a number of ships
, the name of a number of U.S. Navy ships

Universities
Oregon State University, a public university in Corvallis, Oregon
University of Oregon, a public university in Eugene, Oregon

Other
 "Oregon" (Awake), a television episode
 Oregon Ducks, the athletic program of the University of Oregon
 Oregon State Beavers, the athletic program of the Oregon State University
 Oregon Scientific, a manufacturer of electronic products
 The Oricon Charts, often mis-romanized as the "Oregon Charts"
 The Oregon Files, a group of novels written by author Clive Cussler

See also

USS Oregonian (ID-1323)
USS Oregon City (CA-122)